Richard Daniels Jr. (October 11, 1914 – August 20, 1970) known professionally as Mickey Daniels, was an American actor. Signed by Hal Roach in 1921, he was, along with Joe Cobb, Jackie Condon, Jackie Davis, Mary Kornman, and Ernie Morrison, a regular in the popular Our Gang comedies during the silent era of the series, between 1922 and 1926.

Early life and career
Daniels was born in Rock Springs, Wyoming, the son of Welsh-born American actor Richard Daniels and his wife Hannah. In 1921, Daniels was discovered by a talent scout while performing at an amateur night at the Rialto Theatre in Rock Springs. Shortly thereafter, he was signed by Hal Roach to appear in the Our Gang film series. 

The red-haired, freckle-faced Daniels was one of the lead characters in the Our Gang film shorts from 1922 to 1926.  In the earlier shorts, he was often a rival (often with Davis) for Mary Kornman's attentions. He first appeared in the first Our Gang short Our Gang in 1922 when he was 8 years old. He was known for his big, distinctive laugh and a gift for physical comedy and timing. Daniels stayed with the series for four years until he left the series at the age of 12 in 1926. His last film was the 1926 short Thundering Fleas.

After Our Gang, Daniels continued his career in vaudeville and played bit parts in feature films and comedy shorts. From 1930 to 1932, Daniels and former Our Gang co-star Mary Kornman appeared in the film series The Boy Friends for Hal Roach. He continued public appearances with co-star Mary Kornman for feature film roles in the 1940s.

Post acting career
After 1951, Daniels quit the movie industry and began working in construction engineering in the United States and overseas. In 1967, he began working as a taxi driver for Red Top Taxi in San Diego. He remained at that job until his death.

Death
Daniels became a chronic alcoholic and was found dead on August 20, 1970, in a transient hotel in San Diego. His death was attributed to cirrhosis. Daniels is buried at Forest Lawn Memorial Park, Glendale in Glendale, California.

Partial filmography

References

Further reading
 Holmstrom, John. The Moving Picture Boy: An International Encyclopaedia from 1895 to 1995, Norwich, Michael Russell, 1996, p. 64.
 Dye, David. Child and Youth Actors: Filmography of Their Entire Careers, 1914-1985. Jefferson, NC: McFarland & Co., 1988, pp. 48-49.

External links

 
 
 
 

1914 births
1970 deaths
20th-century American male actors
Alcohol-related deaths in California
American male child actors
American male film actors
American male silent film actors
American male stage actors
Burials at Forest Lawn Memorial Park (Glendale)
Deaths from cirrhosis
Hal Roach Studios actors
Male actors from Wyoming
American taxi drivers
People from Rock Springs, Wyoming
Vaudeville performers
American male comedy actors
Our Gang